The Nullarbor demo party is a combined game development and demoscene event in Australia. The event takes place at the beginning of every year in Perth, Western Australia. It was named Nullarbor in reference to Perth's physical isolation from the rest of the Australia. Like other similar demo parties worldwide, it provides a platform for game developers and graphic artists to showcase their skills.

The event is supported by Edith Cowan University, the Western Australian government, Perth ACM SIGGRAPH, Perth IGDA, and many game developers (e.g. :Microsoft and Interzone Games), and is managed by Adrian Boeing and Martin Masek. The party is also supported internationally by demo scene groups from Europe and the USA.

Nullarbor differs from many other demoparties: it does not try to keep the demoscene underground, instead it tries to promote democulture to a wider audience. Nullarbor targets academia, government and industry to promote game development and democulture in order to legitimize the scene. As a result, some of the demo entries diverge from the standard demoscene expectations, for example "Landscape Visualization", which placed 2nd in the demo competition, which were poorly received by the European demoscene which still retains a hacker culture.

Nullarbor is sometimes also referred to as "notrees", which is a play on the name 'Nullarbor'. In 2007, the event was retitled to "Interzone nullarbor 2007", or iz null in a shortened form.

Competitions 
The party includes multiple competitions, including but not limited to:

 video game development
 combined demo
 64k intro
 machinima
 music
 graphics
 short film ("wild") / animation

History 
The first Nullarbor was held in February 2006. It attracted hundreds of visitors. It included only a demo, intro and game development competition, which was held at ECU Mount Lawley. Teams from Europe and Australia competed in the competitions, including a number of interstate entries. Nullarbor was a breakthrough for the Australian demoscene, as the last demo party in Western Australia was the C party in 1994, which was 12 years before Nullarbor. The last demo party in Australia was Coven 2001. Nullarbor broke a 5-year demo party drought in Australia. As a result, Nullarbor attracted a record number of first releases and new demo groups. Game Developers that were also formed in order to compete at the event and added a significant contribution to the Perth game development scene, including the formation of new digital content companies.

In 2007 nullarbor was officially renamed to "Interzone nullarbor", to reflect major sponsorship by Interzone games. It became one of the world's biggest demoparties with over 10,000 visitors, largely thanks to taking place as part of the GO3 electronic entertainment expo and conference in the Perth Convention Exhibition Centre. Some sources report up to 30,000 visitors. The nullarbor competition expanded in 2007 to include animation, pixel art, and music competitions.

The 2008 competition saw a return to the traditional demoparty style taking place at The Bakery art venue in Northbridge, Western Australia. The competition was also extended to include a pitch competition and allow for machinima entries.

Australia obtained a second demoparty in 2007, the Syntax Demoparty in Melbourne, and as of 2008 Perth has had a strong presence in the Local and Global Game Jam events. Subsequently, Nullarbor events have not been held since 2009.

Events 
 nullarbor 2006 (23 February 2006)
 Interzone nullarbor 2007 (30 March 2007 – 31 March 2007)
 nullarbor 2008 (15 August 2008 – 16 August 2008)

In the press 
 Nullarbor media coverage

See also
 List of demoparties

References

External links
 NoTrees.org - Official website
 Pouet - list of Nullarbor releases
 Nullarbor 2006 Releases to download from Scene.org
 Nullarbor 2007 Releases to download from Scene.org
 GO3 Electronic Entertainment Expo 2007
 Perth IGDA
 Perth ACM SIGGRAPH

Recurring events established in 2006
Demo parties
LAN parties
Festivals in Australia
Culture in Perth, Western Australia
2006 establishments in Australia